is a stable of sumo wrestlers, part of the Isegahama ichimon (or group of stables) It is located in Chiba prefecture. 

The stable's predecessor in name had a very long history in sumo, however the current incarnation is unrelated to it. A year after the closing of the previous incarnation of the stable, the retired former Kotonishiki, after several years of borrowing elder names, finally acquired the vacant elder name of Asahiyama, and set up his own stable, a dream he had had from long before. He financed a building to house his stable in Kamagaya, Chiba near Kunugiyama Station on some land he had procured, quite near the stable he originally wrestled for, Sadogatake of the Nishonoseki ichimon. Owner Asahiyama's hope was that he could bring together the demanding training he learned as an active wrestler in his original stable, Sadogatake (one of the strongest stables in sumo) and the warmheartedness towards trainees that he later learned as a coach at Oguruma stable.

He took three low ranked wrestlers from the aforementioned Oguruma stable (which along with Sadogatake is also a member of the same Nishonoseki ichimon) to join his new stable. In January 2017 the stable left the Nishonoseki ichimon and joined the Isegahama ichimon (to which the previous incarnation of Asahiyama stable had belonged.) It was announced in February 2017 that Asahiyama 18-year old son, Akihide, would be joining the stable as a new recruit upon graduation from high school in March. He fights under the name Wakaseido. In January 2023, it had eight wrestlers, with no sekitori yet.

Ring name conventions
Currently, the wrestlers who branched out to the new stable with the former Kotonishiki have taken shikona starting with "Asahi", (朝日) meaning morning sun, and which are the first two characters in the owner's elder name and that of the stable.

Owner
2016-present: 19th Asahiyama (iin, former sekiwake Kotonishiki)

Notable active wrestlers

None

Referee
Shikimori Kandayu (makuuchi gyoji, real name Hiroshi Kikuchi)

Usher
Takeru (jonokuchi yobidashi, real name, Takeru Miyasaka)

Location and access
Chiba, Kamagaya City, Kunigiyama 2-1-5
5 minute walk from Kunugiyama Station on Shin-Keisei Line

See also
List of sumo stables
List of active sumo wrestlers
List of past sumo wrestlers
Glossary of sumo terms

References

External links
Japan Sumo Association profile
Homepage (in Japanese)
Active sumo stables